Poindexter Williams (September 10, 1897 – March 17, 1969), nicknamed "P.D.", was an American Negro league catcher and manager in the 1920s and 1930s.

A native of Decatur, Alabama, Williams made his Negro leagues debut in 1921 with the Chicago American Giants and Detroit Stars. He spent most of his career with the Birmingham Black Barons, and served as Birmingham's manager for three seasons. Williams died in Homewood, Alabama in 1969 at age 71.

References

External links
 and Baseball-Reference Black Baseball stats and Seamheads
  and Seamheads

1897 births
1969 deaths
Birmingham Black Barons players
Chicago American Giants players
Detroit Stars players
Homestead Grays players
Louisville Black Caps players
Louisville White Sox players
Nashville Elite Giants players
20th-century African-American sportspeople
Baseball catchers